Solihull Sixth Form College is a further education college for students aged 16 to 19. It is situated on the outskirts of Solihull in the West Midlands and draws students from across Solihull and Birmingham. Founded in 1974, the college consists of several large buildings on a single site.

The college offers different subjects at A-Level, as well as a small number of vocational courses. The college received an Ofsted inspection in February 2020 with the rating "Good".

Alumni 

Sophie Baggaley, association football goalkeeper
Elizabeth Bower, actress
Anna Brewster, model and actress from The Tudors
Shefali Chowdhury, actress
Lucy Davis, actress
Julian Eastoe, chemist
Simon Fowler, lead singer of rock group Ocean Colour Scene
Richard Harrison, Head of Space Physics and Chief Scientist at Rutherford Appleton Laboratory
Justin King, former CEO of Sainsbury's
Gary Knight, war photographer

See also 
Sixth form

References

External links 
 
Report on the college from OFSTED

Educational institutions established in 1974
Sixth Form College, Solihull
Sixth form colleges in the West Midlands (county)
1974 establishments in England